Radiant3 is a video production company headquartered in Atlanta, Georgia, United States and founded in 2008 by James Boston. Radiant3 was nominated a "Top 25 Business" in 2010 by Atlanta Tribune Magazine. Radiant3 primarily films corporate video and advertisements.

Radiant3's client list includes McDonald's, AT&T Mobility, InComm, Graphic Packaging, Urban One, Hansgrohe, and Professional Photographers of America.

Awards 
The music video for Changed directed by Carl Diebold stars Chip Esten  and won the ACM Award for "Mainstream Inspirational Country Video." Radiant3 also won a Silver Telly on a campaign for Professional Photographers of America and Bronze Telly on a campaign for Dura-Line.

References

External links

Television production companies of the United States